Two ships of the United States Navy have borne the name USS Hazelwood, named in honor of Commodore John Hazelwood, an officer in the Continental Navy.

United States Navy ship names